Melianthus is a genus of flowering plants native to elevated grassland in South Africa.  A common name for these plants is honey flower, which is also the English translation of the Latin name. This name also attaches to the species M. comosus and M. major that are found in cultivation.

The genus contains up to six species of evergreen shrubs.  They have large pinnate leaves with prominent stipules, and erect racemes of nectar-rich flowers. The vegetative parts are very toxic.

Species
The species include: 
Melianthus comosus Vahl
Melianthus dregeanus Sond.
Melianthus elongatus Wijnands
Melianthus major L.
Melianthus pectinatus Harv.	
Melianthus villosus Bolus

References

External links
 Planz Africa website on Melianthus major

Francoaceae
Geraniales genera